The Museo di storia naturale della Maremma (Maremma Natural History Museum) is a natural history museum in Grosseto, Tuscany, Italy.

It was founded in 1971 by naturalist  and completely renewed in 2009.

Bibliography

External links

1971 establishments in Italy
Natural history museums in Italy
Museums in Grosseto